A Man at Arms is a historical novel by the American writer Steven Pressfield. It was first published on March 2, 2021 by W.W. Norton & Company.  It is Pressfield's first novel taking place in the ancient world since The Afghan Campaign, published in 2006.

Summary 
The novel takes place in AD 55.  In the aftermath of the Crucifixion of Jesus, the office of the Roman governor of Judea receives intelligence of a courier traveling to Corinth with a letter from a religious fanatic calling himself Paul the Apostle.  Fearing a mass uprising, the governor's agents hire the mercenary soldier Telamon of Arcadia, a former legionary of the Legio X Fretensis, to track down the courier and retrieve the letter, in exchange for a substantial bounty and amnesty for the otherwise capital crime he has been arrested for.

Telamon, a peregrinus who refused an offer of Roman citizenship after his enlistment was over, works only for money, but once he tracks down the courier, he undergoes an unexpected conversion and instead determines to protect the courier at all costs and ensure that the letter is delivered.

Continuity 
"Telamon of Arcadia" is also the name of a secondary character from Pressfield's 2000 novel Tides of War, which takes place in Greece four centuries earlier, during the Peloponnesian War (431-404 BC).

Reception
Publishers Weekly reviewed the book negatively, writing that "Pressfield’s considerable gifts for historical military fiction...are nowhere in evidence in this ponderous account of Greek mercenary Telamon of Arcadia’s mission to preserve and disseminate the gospel of Paul." Kirkus Reviews, however, called the book "fine historical fiction".

References

External links
 Steven Pressfield's official website

American historical novels
2021 American novels
Novels by Steven Pressfield
Novels set in the 1st century
Novels set in ancient Israel
Novels set in ancient Rome
Historiography of Jesus
English-language books
W. W. Norton & Company books